Dithryca guttularis is a species of tephritid or fruit flies in the genus Dithryca of the family Tephritidae.

Distribution
Europe & West Siberia South to France, Italy, Ukraine & Kazakhstan.

References

Tephritinae
Insects described in 1838
Diptera of Europe
Diptera of Asia